is a 1987 arcade game developed by Capcom. It is the first competitive fighting game produced by the company and the first installment in the Street Fighter series. It was a commercial success in arcades and introduced special attacks and some of the conventions made standard in later fighting games, such as the six-button controls and the use of command-based special moves.

Street Fighter was directed by Takashi Nishiyama, who conceived it by adapting the boss battles of his earlier beat 'em up game Kung-Fu Master (1984) for a one-on-one fighting game, and by drawing influence from popular Japanese shōnen manga.

Its sequel, Street Fighter II (1991), evolved its gameplay with phenomenal worldwide success. Street Fighter also spawned two spiritual successors, Capcom's beat 'em up Final Fight (working title Street Fighter '89) and SNK's fighting game Fatal Fury: King of Fighters (1991), the latter designed by Street Fighter director Takashi Nishiyama.

Gameplay

The player competes in one-on-one matches against a series of computer-controlled opponents or in a single match against another player. Each match consists of three rounds in which the player must knock out an opponent in less than 30 seconds. If a match ends before a fighter is knocked out, the fighter with the greater amount of energy left is the round's winner. The player must win two rounds in order to defeat the opponent and proceed to the next battle. If the third round ends in a tie, then the computer-controlled opponent will win by default or both players will lose. During the single-player mode, the losing player can continue against the same opponent. Likewise, a second player can interrupt a single-player match and challenge the first player to a new match.

In the deluxe version of the arcade game, the player's controls consist of a standard eight-way joystick and two large, unique mechatronic pads for punches and kicks that return an analog value depending on how hard the player actuated the control. An alternate version was released that replaces the two punching pads with an array of six attack buttons, three punch buttons, and three kick buttons of different speeds and strengths: light, medium, and heavy.

The player uses the joystick to move left or right, and to jump, crouch, and block. By using the attack buttons and pads in combination with the joystick, the player can perform a variety of attacks from standing, jumping, or crouching positions. Three special techniques require a specific series of joystick and button inputs.
 
 
 .
This is the first game to use such a concept. Unlike its sequels and other fighting games, the specific commands for these special moves are not given in the arcade game's instruction card, which instead encourages the player to discover these techniques.

The single-player mode consists of a series of battles against ten opponents from five different nations. At the beginning of the game, the player can choose Japan or the United States, and China or England depending on the game's configuration. The player fights two fighters from the chosen country and proceeds to the next country. Two types of bonus games give additional points: brick breaking and table breaking. After defeating the initial eight characters, the player travels to Thailand for the last two opponents.

Characters
The player takes control of a young Japanese martial artist named Ryu, who competes in the Street Fighter tournament to prove his strength, and the second player takes control of Ryu's former partner and current rival Ken, who only jumps into the tournament unqualified to challenge Ryu in two-player matches. Normally, the player takes control of Ryu in the single-player mode; however, if the player controlling Ken defeats Ryu in a 2-player match, the winning player will play the remainder of the game as Ken. The differences between the two characters are aesthetic, with the same basic moves and special techniques.

The first eight computer-controlled opponents are: from Japan, Retsu, an expelled Shorinji Kempo instructor and Geki, a tekkō kagi-wielding ninja; from the United States, Joe, an underground full-contact karate champion and Mike, a former heavyweight boxer who once killed an opponent in the ring; from China, Lee, an expert in Chinese boxing and Gen, an elderly professional killer who has developed his own assassination art; and from England, Birdie, a tall bouncer who uses a combination of wrestling and boxing techniques and Eagle, a well-dressed bodyguard of a wealthy family who uses Kali sticks. After the first eight challengers are defeated, the player is taken to Thailand for the last two adversaries: Adon, a deadly muay Thai master, and his mentor Sagat, the reputed "Emperor of Muay Thai" and the game's final opponent.

Development
Takashi Nishiyama conceived Street Fighter after working on Irem's 1984 beat 'em up game Kung-Fu Master (called Spartan X in Japan), which has a number of boss fights; Nishiyama considered making a game centered around those boss fights. In turn, the boss fights were inspired by the Bruce Lee film Game of Death (1972). Following the success of Kung-Fu Master, Nishiyama was hired by Capcom. He designed an arcade successor for Capcom, Trojan (1986), a beat 'em up which evolved the basic gameplay concepts of Kung-Fu Master; the NES port has a one-on-one fighting mode, for the first time in a Capcom game. Nishiyama later designed Street Fighter. The game was also influenced by the earlier fighting games Karate Champ (1984) and Yie Ar Kung-Fu (1984). The gameplay of Karate Champ, Kung-Fu Master and Yie Ar Kung Fu provided a basic template for Street Fighter. Nishiyama wanted the game to have a story similar to a film.

Street Fighter was produced and directed by Takashi Nishiyama (who is credited as "Piston Takashi") and planned by Hiroshi Matsumoto (credited as "Finish Hiroshi"), who both previously worked on the overhead beat 'em up Avengers (1987). They would leave Capcom after the production of the game and were employed by SNK, developing most of their fighting game series including Fatal Fury and Art of Fighting. They would later work for Dimps and work on Street Fighter IV with Capcom. Keiji Inafune, best known for his artwork in Capcom's Mega Man franchise, got his start at the company by designing and illustrating the character portraits in Street Fighter. Nishiyama drew several inspirations for developing the original gameplay of Street Fighter from martial art styles he was practicing.

The designers at Capcom took inspiration from Bruce Lee's 1973 martial arts film Enter the Dragon. That and Street Fighter are similarly centered around an international fighting tournament, with each character having a unique combination of ethnicity, nationality, and fighting style. Nishiyama was also inspired by popular Japanese shōnen manga and anime, including an energy attack called Hadouho (lit. the "Wave Motion Gun") from the 1970s anime series Space Battleship Yamato as the origin of the Hadouken move. The game's title was named after Sonny Chiba's The Street Fighter (1974).

Release

Arcade variants

Two different arcade cabinets were sold for the game: a "Regular" version (which was sold as a tabletop cabinet in Japan and as an upright overseas) with the same six-button configuration later used in Street Fighter II and a "Deluxe" cabinet with two pressure-sensitive rubber pads. The pressure-sensitive pads determine the strength and speed of attacks.

In the worldwide versions, Ryu's and Ken's voices were dubbed so that they yell the names of their moves in English, such as Psycho Fire, Dragon Punch, and Hurricane Kick. Subsequent localized releases until Street Fighter IV left the Japanese voices intact; since Street Fighter IV, the series contains English voice acting, and Asian characters use Japanese names for certain special moves and super combos among otherwise English dialogue.

Home versions
Street Fighter was ported as Fighting Street in 1988 for the PC Engine CD-ROM² System in Japan and 1989 for the TurboGrafx-CD in North America. There was no six-button controller for the TurboGrafx-CD at the time, so the attack strength is determined by the duration of the button-press, akin to the Deluxe arcade version. It has a remastered soundtrack and covers artwork of Mount Rushmore, an in-game location. It was developed by Alfa System and published by NEC Avenue in North America and Hudson Soft in Japan. It was re-released for the Wii's Virtual Console in Japan on October 6, 2009, in North America on November 2, 2009, and in the PAL regions on November 6, 2009.

Versions for the Commodore 64, ZX Spectrum, Amstrad CPC, Amiga, and Atari ST were developed by Tiertex and published by U.S. Gold in 1988 in Europe. A different Commodore 64 version was developed by Pacific Dataworks and published by Capcom USA. Capcom also published an MS-DOS version in 1989, developed by Hi-Tech Expressions. Hi-Tech re-released the game as part of the Street Fighter Series CD-ROM collection.

An emulation of the original arcade version is in Capcom Arcade Hits Volume 1 (along with Street Fighter II': Champion Edition) for Windows, Capcom Classics Collection Remixed for the PlayStation Portable and Capcom Classics Collection Vol. 2 (along with Super Street Fighter II Turbo) for the PlayStation 2 and Xbox, and Street Fighter 30th Anniversary Collection for PlayStation 4, Xbox One, Nintendo Switch, and Windows.

Reception

Arcade
The original punching-pad cabinet was not successful as Capcom had planned, with only around 1,000 units sold. However, the alternate six-button version was more successful, selling in the tens of thousands, with estimates ranging from between 10,000 and 50,000 units sold. In Japan, Game Machine listed Street Fighter on its September 15, 1987, issue as the fifth most-successful upright arcade unit of the month, before reaching No. 3 in October 1987 and then No. 1 in January 1988. It became Japan's fifth highest-grossing large arcade game of 1987, and the country's eighth highest-grossing arcade game of 1988. In the United Kingdom, the Coinslot charts, in the August 1988 issue of Sinclair User, listed Street Fighter as the top-grossing dedicated arcade game of the month. It was not as successful in the United States, where it peaked at No. 10 on the RePlay upright cabinet chart in December 1987.

The arcade game received positive to mixed reviews, with critics praising the combat and graphics but criticizing the pressure-pad controls. Upon release in August 1987, Commodore User magazine said it has some of the "most unusual features which make it worthy of note" such as the experimental rubber pad controls and the large 24-inch screen displaying large detailed sprite graphics. However, the review said "the fairly repetitive nature of the game, and the large amount of physical effort needed to play it, will prevent Street Fighter from being much more than a novel experiment in coin-op technology" but that only "time will tell". In September, Tony Thompson of Crash said it "breathes new life" into martial arts games, with a "huge" cabinet, "big" characters, pads where "the harder you hit the pads the harder your character hits" and "secret techniques" but criticized it for making his "hands hurt". In December 1987, Julian Rignall and Daniel Gilbert of Crash said "it adds a new dimension with pneumatic punch buttons" and the action is "gratifying" with "great feedback from the buttons" but "there's very little to draw you back" after the novelty wears off.

Clare Edgeley of Computer and Video Games said in December 1987 that the arcade game had "huge" sprites, "among the most realistic" characters, and "intense" action, but requires mastering the controls, including punches, kicks, stoop kicks, flip kicks, and backward flips. She said "the competition is intense" and the deluxe version "is much more fun". Computer and Video Games said in May 1988 that the arcade game was "one of the most realistic martial arts combat games, a sort of street Olympics" with international opponents.

Ports

The ZX Spectrum version received positive reviews. While reviewing the Spectrum version, Sinclair User awarded the game a maximum rating and called it "one of the games of the year".

The Amiga and Atari ST versions received mixed reviews. Génération 4 gave them a positive review. Julian Rignall of Computer and Video Games reviewed the Amiga and Atari ST versions, stating that the game had "no lasting appeal whatsoever".

Legacy

Street Fighters niche evolved, partly because many arcade game developers in the 1980s focused more on producing beat-em-up and shoot 'em up games. Part of the appeal was the use of special moves that can only be discovered by experimenting with controls, which created a sense of mystique and invited players to practice the game. Following Street Fighters lead, the use of command-based hidden moves began to pervade other games in the rising fighting game genre. Street Fighter introduced other staples of the genre, including the blocking technique and the ability for a challenger to spontaneously initiate a match against a player. The game introduced pressure-sensitive controls that determine the strength of an attack. However, due to this encouraging damage, Capcom soon replaced it with a six-button control scheme offering light, medium, and hard punches and kicks, which became another staple of the genre. Yoshinori Ono considers Street Fighter to be "the first modern day fighting game".

Capcom's beat 'em up Final Fight (1989) began development as a sequel called Street Fighter '89. According to the developers, they were originally planning to have Ryu and Ken as the main protagonists, but changed to a new plot and setting. SNK's fighting game Fatal Fury: King of Fighters (1991) was designed by Takashi Nishiyama, the director of Street Fighter. Nishiyama envisioned Fatal Fury as a spiritual successor to Street Fighter, developed around the same time as Street Fighter II (1991). Street Fighter II focuses on combos, and Fatal Fury focuses on special move timing and on storytelling. Street Fighter also influenced Makoto Uchida as lead designer of Sega's hack and slash beat 'em up Golden Axe (1989), particularly with combo moves.

Notes

References

Bibliography

External links

 

1987 video games
2D fighting games
Amiga games
Amstrad CPC games
Arcade video games
Atari ST games
Cancelled Nintendo Entertainment System games
Commodore 64 games
DOS games
Street Fighter games
TurboGrafx-CD games
Video games developed in Japan
Video games scored by Yasuhiko Fukuda
Video games set in Japan
Video games set in England
Video games set in China
Video games set in the United States
Video games set in Thailand
Virtual Console games
ZX Spectrum games
Multiplayer and single-player video games
Tiertex Design Studios games
U.S. Gold games
Alfa System games
Hudson Soft games